"Flick of the Wrist" is a song by the British rock band Queen, released as a double A-side with "Killer Queen" in the United Kingdom, Canada, the Netherlands, the United States and most other territories. It was written by Freddie Mercury for the 1974 album Sheer Heart Attack.

Background
Freddie Mercury explained that the unpleasant character in the song was not based on anyone in particular: "I wrote it as a sort of tongue-in-cheek story about the con-men and rip-off artists we're always running into. Our manager would like to think it's about him, but it's not."
The song includes Freddie Mercury singing octave vocals throughout the verses, and the chorus features a call-and-response style section between the backing and lead vocal parts. When Brian May returned to work having recovered from his hepatitis, he had not heard the song before he recorded his guitar and backing vocals.

Album version
As it appears on the album, "Flick of the Wrist" is the middle song of a three-track series of songs which seamlessly overlap, segueing from one to the next: "Tenement Funster", "Flick of the Wrist"  and "Lily of the Valley". Each song was recorded separately and later mixed together to form the unbroken stretch of music. Because of this structure, the record company had to select points to separate each track on CD re-issues of the album. "Flick of the Wrist," in this way, starts with the crescendo ending of "Tenement Funster" and ends abruptly before the last line of the song "...baby, you've been had." This last lyric appears at the beginning of the next CD track, "Lily of the Valley".

The original, non-segued master recordings of "Tenement Funster," "Flick of the Wrist" and "Lily of the Valley" were used for certain single releases, such the Japanese 3-inch CD single re-issue of Good Old Fashioned Lover Boy ("Tenement Funster"), the Dutch AA-side version of "Flick of the Wrist" (see below) and the 1975 US-only re-issue of "Keep Yourself Alive" ("Lily of the Valley"). Thus, a standalone version of "Flick of the Wrist" is available.

Single versions
All the single versions and edits are from the original album recording.

The Dutch AA-side version features the complete song without the seguing, overlapping sections from "Tenement Funster" and "Lily of the Valley".

The UK AA-side version features almost the same complete version as the Dutch version, but with a few notes edited at the beginning. This version also features on the 1991 Japanese 3-inch CD single of "Killer Queen"/"Flick of the Wrist."

The US AA-side version (the same as issued in Canada) has a much more pronounced edit at the beginning, with the first 18 seconds of the song absent. It ends with a fade-out over the segue into "Lily of the Valley," where the latter's opening piano is heard.

The UK's 1987 3-inch CD single re-issue starts with the crescendo segue which ends "Tenement Funster." It ends with a fade-out before the song is properly over, missing the last line "Baby, you've been had."

BBC Version
On 16 October 1974, Queen recorded a BBC session at Maida Vale 4 Studios in London, England. One of the songs recorded was "Flick of the Wrist". This performance features parts of the original album backing track with new vocals by Freddie Mercury and a new guitar solo by Brian May, differing entirely from that which appears on the album.

Personnel
Freddie Mercury - lead and backing vocals, piano
Brian May - electric lead and rhythm guitars, backing vocals
Roger Taylor - drums, percussion, backing vocals
John Deacon - bass

References

External links
 Lyrics at Queen official website

Queen (band) songs
1974 singles
Songs written by Freddie Mercury
Song recordings produced by Roy Thomas Baker
EMI Records singles
Elektra Records singles
Hollywood Records singles
1974 songs
British hard rock songs
Glam rock songs